Mohamad Aniq bin Kasdan is a Malaysian weightlifter. He won the silver medal in the Clean & Jerk men's 55 kg event at the 2021 World Weightlifting Championships held in Tashkent, Uzbekistan. He also created history by being the first Malaysian weightlifter to win a medal in the World Weightlifting Championships.

Career 
In 2021, Aniq won a gold medal at the Commonwealth Weightlifting Championships in Tashkent, Uzbekistan. He also won a bronze medal at the 2021 Southeast Asian Games in Hanoi.

In 2022, Aniq participated in the Commonwealth Games weightlifting 55 kg category. He set a new Games record of 142 kg, won Malaysia's first medal and first gold medal in the Games.

References

External links

Living people
Malaysian people of Malay descent
Malaysian male weightlifters
2002 births
People from Johor
Southeast Asian Games medalists in weightlifting
Aniq Kasdan
Competitors at the 2021 Southeast Asian Games
Weightlifters at the 2022 Commonwealth Games
Commonwealth Games gold medallists for Malaysia
Commonwealth Games medallists in weightlifting
21st-century Malaysian people
Medallists at the 2022 Commonwealth Games